Ángel José del Tránsito Sartori Arellano (born 6 February 1948) is a Chilean politician who served as minister of State. He was national director of the Agricultural and Livestock Service of Chile (SAG).

References

External links
 Profile at InfoLobby

1948 births
Living people
Chilean people of Italian descent
University of Chile alumni
20th-century Chilean politicians
21st-century Chilean politicians
Christian Democratic Party (Chile) politicians